Keillor is a surname of Scottish origin. It is thought to derive from the Scottish Gaelic word "gu leòr" (modern English, “galore”) meaning "sufficient," "enough" or "plenty."

Origin and variants 
Keillor is a habitational name derived from a small settlement called "Keillor" in the village of Kettins near the town of Coupar Angus in the council area of Perth and Kinross in northeastern Scotland. Though presently in Perth and Kinross, Keillor, which lies on the border between Perth and Kinross and the council area of Angus, was originally in Angus (previously known as Forfarshire) until the area was transferred to the historic county of Perthshire (now Perth and Kinross) in 1891.

A very old surname, the first Keillor family lived at Keillor where they had historically held a family seat. Although originally a Scottish name, it is also historically concentrated in Northern England, most notably in the region of Yorkshire.

Until the gradual standardization of English spelling in the last few centuries, English lacked any comprehensive system of spelling. Medieval Scottish names, particularly as they were anglicized from the original Gaelic, historically displayed wide variations in recorded spellings as scribes of the era spelled words according to how they sounded rather than any set of rules. This means that a person's name was often spelled several different ways over a lifetime. As such, different variations of the Keillor surname usually have the same origin. Aside from the United Kingdom, variants of the surname can be found today across the English-speaking world, particularly in Michigan, Wisconsin, Minnesota, and Ontario in North America, and in Australia.

Notable people with the surname 
 Alex Keillor, Scottish footballer
 Garrison Keillor, American humorist
 Steven Keillor, American historian
Alexander Keiller (disambiguation)
John Keiller MacKay, PC, DSO, VD, QC (1888–1970), the 19th Lieutenant Governor of Ontario from 1957 to 1963
Keiller Mackay Collegiate Institute (KMCI), a medium-sized high school located in Toronto's west end
Janet Keiller's marmalade, the first commercial brand of marmalade, produced in Dundee, Scotland
Patrick Keiller (born 1950), British filmmaker, writer and lecturer

See also 
 Keeler (disambiguation), place or surname
Keeley (disambiguation)

References

Scottish surnames
Surnames of Scottish origin
Surnames of British Isles origin